Jarf  is a village and the capital of Shekay District in Badakhshan Province, in north-eastern Afghanistan.

References 

Populated places in Shekay District